The Iranian ambassador in Riyadh was the official representative of the Government in Tehran to the Government of Saudi Arabia.

The head of the Iranian Interests Section in the Consulate of Switzerland in Jeddah represents the Iranian interests in Saudi Arabia.

List of representatives

See also
Iran–Saudi Arabia relations

References

Iran–Saudi Arabia relations
Ambassadors of Iran to Saudi Arabia
Saudi Arabia
Iran